Neriacanthus harlingii is a species of plant in the family Acanthaceae. It is endemic to Ecuador.  Its natural habitat is subtropical or tropical moist montane forests. It is threatened by habitat loss.

References

Acanthaceae
Flora of Ecuador
Vulnerable plants
Taxonomy articles created by Polbot